Fleet is a hamlet in central Alberta, Canada within the County of Paintearth No. 18.

Demographics 
Fleet recorded a population of 28 in the 1991 Census of Population conducted by Statistics Canada.

See also 
List of communities in Alberta
List of hamlets in Alberta

References 

Hamlets in Alberta
County of Paintearth No. 18